The opening ceremony for the 2014 Commonwealth Games was held at Celtic Park in Glasgow, Scotland, between 21:00 and 23:40 BST, on 23 July 2014.

Proceedings

Countdown
The ceremony began with a dramatic countdown, starting at 30 seconds, which was then interrupted at 15 seconds by Scottish actor Ewan McGregor to announce a partnership with the 2014 Commonwealth Games and UNICEF. During this segment, McGregor claims that the games hope to "team up" with the viewers and would announce further details later in the show. The ceremony then continues with a countdown, starting from 14 seconds, with "The Mother We Share" by Chvrches playing, featuring arial shots of Glasgow, including the River Clyde and Clyde Arc.

Welcome to Scotland

The ceremony show begins with a camera zooming in on Scottish comedian Karen Dunbar who is sitting in the audience of Celtic Park. Dunbar stands up and begins to sing in a cappella accompanied by backing dancers, singing a song entitled "Welcome to Scotland". Dunbar is then joined by John Barrowman who emerges from behind a kilt in a car who transports him around the stadium on a tour around Scotland that has been created within the stadium, taking viewers through areas such as Ayrshire, where they focus on the works of Robert Burns, Gretna Green, significant as a place of marriage as the age of marriage in Scotland was lower than that elsewhere in the British Isles. The ceremony then focuses on the works of the River Clyde shipbuilding industry and the various ships constructed in Glasgow on the River Clyde during its peak of production.

The Highlands are represented through a rendition of "Loch Lomond" by Scottish band Runrig. Scottish culture is showcased through a variety of people dancing in costumes styled as Tunnock tea cakes, followed by a makeshift Loch Ness Monster being celebrated as a showcase of Scottish tourism and heraldry. Highland Cow, Highland pony and Dolly the Sheep are mentioned as a further showcase of Scottish culture and wildlife.

The ceremony recognises Scotland as the home of golf with a showcase focusing on St Andrews. Lastly, Barrowman then begins rapidly listing a list of Scottish inventions, such as the telephone, tyre, television and the toilet to name a few.

The segment finishes with Dunbar singing alone on top of the bus with a model of the Forth Bridge. Dunbar then begins singing "Welcome to Scotland" followed by the volunteers used during the opening production waving into the camera as they run off the platform. Barrowman is then seen standing on a constructed model of the Finnieston Crane with the message "Welcome to Glasgow" displayed in an LED screen behind him.

Come on In

Dunbar welcomes the crowd to the games and the broadcast cuts to thousands of spectators watching the ceremony at Glasgow Green. Amy MacDonald performs a rendition of "Rhythm of My Heart" in George Square with the public of Glasgow. Following a pre-recorded segment in George Square, MacDonald then sings part of the song in the stadium before welcoming Rod Stewart who then finishes off the song.

Arrival of the Queen

As with tradition at Commonwealth Games opening ceremonies, the Flag of India, Flag of Scotland and the Flag of Australia are raised, with India hosting the previous games in 2010, Scotland hosting the current games in 2014, and Australia hosting the next games in 2018. Susan Boyle performs a rendition of "Mull of Kintyre" to usher in Queen Elizabeth II accompanied by Prince Philip, Duke of Edinburgh. The British national anthem "God Save the Queen" was then performed. The Red Arrows fly over by, with blue and white smoke to symbolise the 2014 Commonwealth Games being held in Scotland.

Arrival of the Queen's Baton

The Queen's Baton is flown into Glasgow on a sea plane that lands on the River Clyde and is carried by broadcaster and cyclist Mark Beaumont.

Tartan display

In preparation for the Parade of Nations, volunteers perform to "Feel So Close" by Scottish DJ Calvin Harris, and music included by Andy Stewart as a tribute to his contribution to Scottish music and culture. Volunteer dancers are then seen erecting chairs for the athletes which were sourced across Glasgow. 500 volunteer dancers were used for this segment of the ceremony.

Parade of Nations

The ceremony was directed by David Zolkwer and included the 2014 Commonwealth Games Parade of Nations where 71 athletes, bearing the flags of their respective nations and territories, led their national delegations as they paraded into the stadium. The games were formally opened by Her Majesty Queen Elizabeth II. She referred to the Commonwealth's "shared ideals and ambitions" and the "bonds that unite" its members.

During the Parade of Nations at the 2014 Commonwealth Games opening ceremony, held on 23 July 2014, 71 athletes bearing the flags of their respective nations lead their national delegations as they paraded into Celtic Park in the host city of Glasgow, Scotland. Each team was led out by a Scottish Terrier, wearing a jacket bearing the name of the country, followed by the flag bearer for that nation.

As the host of the last games, India entered first, followed by the rest of the Asian countries competing. Following this was Oceania, Africa, the Caribbean, the Americas and finally Europe. The Scotland team entered last, representing the host nation. In all cases nations entered in alphabetic order of their country names in English within their regions (besides India and Scotland).

In honouring the victims of the Malaysia Airlines Flight 17 tragedy that occurred the week before the opening ceremony, the Malaysian delegation was led by eight athletes in Malaysia Airlines cabin crew uniform while the remaining athletes and officials wore black armbands, and the national flag was at half mast. A minute's silence was also observed.

Countries and flagbearers
Below is a list of parading countries and their announced flag bearer, in the same order as the parade.  This is sortable by country name, flag bearer's name, or flag bearer's sport.  Names are given in the form officially designated by the CGF. The first team to enter the stadium was India, host of the 2010 Commonwealth Games, maintaining the tradition of the immediate previous host nation entering first.

Programme

The programme, which included about 2,000 performers, featured Karen Dunbar, John Barrowman, Amy Macdonald, Rod Stewart, Susan Boyle, Nicola Benedetti, Julie Fowlis, Pumeza Matshikiza, Eric Whitacre and the National Youth Choir of Scotland, as well as a message from the International Space Station. The ceremony began with a countdown and a recorded video message from Scottish actor Ewan McGregor, explaining the partnership between the Games and UNICEF.

Following the arrival of the Queen there was a flypast by the Red Arrows display team. The venue featured the largest LED video screen in Europe, supplied by Sports Technology. Scotland's then First Minister Alex Salmond welcomed the participants and spectators, and introduced a moment of silence in memory of the Malaysia Airlines Flight 17 disaster.

The final part of the Queen's Baton Relay was run by 32 Scottish volunteers nominated for giving their time to developing the nation's youth through sport. The baton was then passed to Sir Chris Hoy, who delivered it to President of the Commonwealth Games Federation Prince Imran and the Queen. The display of the message concealed within the baton was delayed by a difficulty in opening the device.

The Games were launched in partnership with UNICEF, to save and change children’s lives. The unique partnership aimed "to use the power of sport to reach every child in Scotland and benefit children in every Commonwealth nation and territory."

Broadcast
The ceremony was broadcast by BBC One, and was introduced by Gary Lineker, Hazel Irvine, Clare Balding and Huw Edwards. The estimated worldwide television audience was one billion, with 9 million in the UK.

References

External links

 Official ceremonies page

Opening Ceremony
Commonwealth Games opening ceremonies
Ceremonies in the United Kingdom
Articles containing video clips